The 1969 COFL season was the fifth and final season of the Continental Football League (COFL). Following the season, nine of the league's remaining teams split from the league, with five forming the Trans-American Football League and four joining the Atlantic Coast Football League.

Franchise changes
The Michigan Arrows moved to Midland, Michigan and became the Tri-City Apollos. They were an informal farm team of the NFL's Detroit Lions.
The Hawaii Warriors were announced as a new league franchise in January 1969, but were unable to raise the necessary money to keep the team alive. Their spot in the league was instead given to Portland, Oregon.
A franchise was awarded to Newark, New Jersey, which was subsequently named the Jersey Jays. The Jays were later announced to be a farm team of the NFL's Cleveland Browns.
The Orange County Ramblers announced a relocation to San Bernardino, California but had their franchise revoked several weeks later for failing to confirm conditional approval. Their player contracts were later assumed by the Portland Loggers.
On September 21, 1969 the Mexico Golden Aztecs ceased operations and forfeited the remainder of their 1969 schedule.
The Spokane Shockers became a farm team of the AFL's Oakland Raiders.
The TFL's El Paso Jets franchise was revoked for failure to comply with league regulations regarding several issues.

General news
James Dunn was named commissioner of the league.
On January 25, 1969 it was announced that the COFL was adding the entirety of the eight-team Texas Football League to its ranks. The TFL joined as a separate entity and was placed into the new Texas Division (itself split into East and West). The new teams were mostly scheduled to play against each other but did also play interleague contests.
The league office moved from San Jose to Indianapolis.
As a result of the addition of the eight TFL franchises, the league was split into four divisions.
The league established the Glen Hepburn Memorial Award for Community Service, named for an Omaha Mustangs player who died from an injury sustained during a game the previous September.

Regular season
W = Wins, L = Losses, T = Ties, PCT= Winning Percentage, PF= Points For, PA = Points Against

 = Division Champion

Playoffs
Home team in CAPITALS

Divisional playoffs, round 1 (November 29, 1969)
 San Antonio 20, TEXARKANA 7
 Las Vegas 31, SACRAMENTO 0
 INDIANAPOLIS 27, Orlando 7

Divisional playoffs, round 2 (December 7, 1969)
 SAN ANTONIO 21, Las Vegas 17

League Championship (December 13, 1969)
 INDIANAPOLIS 44, San Antonio 38 (OT)

Awards
 MVP: Johnnie Walton, QB, Indianapolis
 Coach of the Year: Ken Carpenter, Indianapolis

References

Continental Football League seasons
1969 in American football